Kent is a former city in Union County, Iowa, United States. The population was 52 at the 2000 census. In 2003, after years of rural flight, the tiny city was disincorporated, ending its status as an officially recognized community. As of the 2010 census, Kent was recognized as a census-designated place with a population of 61.

Geography
Kent is located at  (40.953106, -94.456566).

Demographics

As of the census of 2000, there were 52 people, 23 households, and 14 families residing in the city. The racial makeup of the city was 100.00% White.

There were 23 households, out of which 21.7% had children under the age of 18 living with them, 47.8% were married couples living together, and 39.1% were non-families. 30.4% of all households were made up of individuals, and 8.7% had someone living alone who was 65 years of age or older. The average household size was 2.26 and the average family size was 2.64.

In the city the population was spread out, with 17.3% under the age of 18, 9.6% from 18 to 24, 32.7% from 25 to 44, 28.8% from 45 to 64, and 11.5% who were 65 years of age or older. The median age was 42 years. For every 100 females, there were 116.7 males. For every 100 females age 18 and over, there were 126.3 males.

The median income for a household in the city was $27,917, and the median income for a family was $22,188. Males had a median income of $23,125 versus $26,250 for females. The per capita income for the city was $13,529. There were 18.2% of families and 17.1% of the population living below the poverty line, including no under eighteens and none of those over 64.

See also

Other discontinued cities in Iowa:
 Athelstan
 Donnan
 Green Island
 
 Littleport

References

Populated places disestablished in 2003
Former populated places in Iowa
Census-designated places in Iowa
Census-designated places in Union County, Iowa